Taraira Airport  is an airport serving the town of Taraira in the Vaupés Department of Colombia. The runway is adjacent to and running southwest from the town.

See also

Transport in Colombia
List of airports in Colombia

References

Google Earth Historical Imagery

External links
OpenStreetMap - Taraira
Taraira Airport

Airports in Colombia